The 1993 Purdue Boilermakers football team was an American football team that represented Purdue University as a member of the Big Ten Conference during the 1993 NCAA Division I-A football season. Led by third-year head coach Jim Colletto, the Boilermakers compiled an overall record of 1–10 with a mark of 0–8 in conference play, tying for tenth place in the Big Ten. Purdue suffered its ninth consecutive losing season and was winless in conference for the first since the 1946 Purdue Boilermakers football team do so. The team played home games at Ross–Ade Stadium in West Lafayette, Indiana.

Schedule

Game summaries

Minnesota
 Mike Alstott 21 rushes, 171 yards

Indiana
 Corey Rogers 20 rushes, 123 yards

References

Purdue
Purdue Boilermakers football seasons
Purdue Boilermakers football